"Of Angels and Angles" is a track by The Decemberists off their album Picaresque. It is the eleventh and final song on the album. Its title is likely an allusion to the phrase Non Angli, sed Angeli ("Not Angles, but Angels"). In legend, this was a Latin pun allegedly said by Pope Gregory I after a response to his query regarding the identity of a group of fair-haired Anglian children whom he had observed in the marketplace. 

Alternatively, it could be a reference to Saul Alinsky, author of Rules for Radicals which contains the line "...is a world not of angels, but of angles where men speak of moral principles but act on power principles".

The song is unique on the album in that it features only vocalist Colin Meloy with acoustic guitar accompaniment.

References

The Decemberists songs
2005 songs
Songs written by Colin Meloy